Neringa may refer to:
Neringa Municipality, a municipality in Lithuania.
, a city district of Klaipėda, Lithuania
Neringa (giant), a character in Baltic mythology
Neringa (name), Lithuanian female name
, Lithuanian glider 
Neringa (production association), Lithuanian toy manufacturer